Sorghum virgatum, Tunis grass, is a species of flowering plant in the family Poaceae. It is found across the Sahel region, up the Nile valley, and on to the Levant, and has been introduced to Morocco and Ethiopia. It contributed genetic material during the creation of domesticated sorghum, Sorghum bicolor.

References

virgatum
Flora of Senegal
Flora of Mauritania
Flora of Mali
Flora of Niger
Flora of Chad
Flora of Sudan
Flora of Egypt
Flora of Sinai
Flora of Palestine (region)
Flora of Lebanon
Flora of Syria
Plants described in 1917
Taxa named by Eduard Hackel